This list of tallest buildings in Slovakia ranks buildings in Slovakia by official height.

The tallest structure in Slovakia is the 318-metre (1,043 ft) Dubnik Transmitter. The tallest Slovak skyscraper is Eurovea Tower in Bratislava. It is 168-metre (551 ft) tall. First skyscraper was  built in 1935, it has 12 floors and it is 50-metre (160 ft) tall, it was built in Bratislava.

Tallest buildings 

Under construction, proposed
This list contains tallest buildings in Slovakia which are under construction or proposed.

Under construction

Proposed

References

Slovakia

Tallest
Slovakia